Bink And Gollie is a children's book by Kate Dicamillo and Alison McGhee. Illustrated by Tony Fucile, this book contains three stories of two best friends: one tiny and one tall.

Reception
The magazine Kirkus Reviews compared the two best friends in this book series to James Marshall's George and Martha. The review complimented the cartoonish artwork as "expressive and hilarious", including the "black-and-white scratchy lines and washes" that highlight objects using spot color such as rainbow socks.

Awards
This book received the Theodore Seuss Geisel Medal in 2011.

References

2010 children's books
American children's books
American picture books